Usmanabad or Osmanabad is a neighborhood in Karachi, Pakistan, that is within Malir District.

There are several ethnic groups in Usmanabad including Muhajirs, Sindhis, Punjabis, Kashmiris, Seraikis, Pakhtuns, Balochis, Memons, Bohras, Ismailis and Christians.

See also
 Haji Camp

References

External links 
 Karachi Website.

Neighbourhoods of Karachi